Operación Pacífico is an American drama television series produced by Telemundo Global Studios and Fox Telecolombia for Telemundo. The series it premiered on 10 February 2020 and ended on 17 April of the same year.

Synopsis 
The series revolves around Amalia Ortega (Majida Issa), a leading and brilliant federal agent of the secret investigation unit of the National Police that has the mission and personal objective of capturing El Guapo, one of the last drug traffickers on the northern border of Mexico.

Cast  
An extensive cast list was published in November 2019 by the American magazines People en Español and Vidamoderna.com

Main 
 Majida Issa as Amalia Ortega
 Mark Tacher as Gabriel Pedraza
 Julio Bracho as Rodolfo Espinosa Roldán "El Guapo"
 Christian Tappan as Major Ernesto Vargas
 Luciano D'Alessandro as Jorge Camacho
 Klemen Novak as Agent Bradley Jones 
 Ernesto Benjumea as General Álvaro López 
 Shany Nadan as Teniente Paula Gaitán
 Johanna Fadul as Mariana Ortega
 Emmanuel Orenday as Guerrero
 Cynthia Alesco as Lupe
 Ronald Torres
 Juan Carlos Cruz
 Mauricio Sánchez
 Jerónimo Barón as Matías Camacho 
 José Castaño as Lorenzo Camacho 
 Jorge Enrique Abello as Señor M
 Antonio de la Vega as Raúl Aparicio
 Jorge Zárate as El Doctor

Recurring 
 Óscar Borda
 Luigi Aicardi
 Katherine Velez
 Diana Wiswell
 Lina Cardona

Production 
The series was confirmed in May 2019 during the Telemundo upfront for the 2019–2020 television season, with Majida Issa as the main protagonist, and Mark Tacher as the second protagonist. Although the series has been filming since May 2019, Telemundo made the official announcement of the start of production on 21 October 2019. In addition, Venezuelan actor Luciano D'Alessandro was confirmed as the third protagonist, and Johanna Fadul.

Episodes

Television ratings 
 
}}

References 

Telemundo original programming
2020 American television series debuts
2020 American television series endings
2020 telenovelas
Spanish-language television shows
Telemundo telenovelas
Television series about organized crime
Television series produced by Fox Telecolombia
Works about Mexican drug cartels